Acratophorus is an extinct genus of dicynodont that lived during the Anisian age of the Middle Triassic-aged Río Seco de la Quebrada Formation in what is now Argentina. The type species, A. argentinensis, was originally placed in the genus Kannemeyeria by Jose Bonaparte in 1966, and later sometimes referred to Vinceria, before being transferred to a new, distinct genus, Acratophorus, in 2021 by Christian Kammerer and Angi Ordoñez. The species Vinceria vieja was also made a synonym of A. argentinensis in 2021. The holotype is PVL 3645, a partial skeleton discovered near a farm house in Puesto Viejo.

References

Dicynodonts
Anisian life
Triassic Argentina
Fossils of Argentina
Fossil taxa described in 2021